Blaengarw is the uppermost village in the river valley (Cwm Garw) of the River Garw, in the county borough of Bridgend, Wales.

In the English language Blaengarw means the rugged 'front' or 'head' of the valley. The population of Blaengarw ward according to the 2001 census was 1,895, falling to 1,789 at the 2011 census.

History

During the 19th and 20th centuries the village served as a mining town for the coal miners of the Garw Valley section of the South Wales coalfield. Built in 1893, the Blaengarw Workmen's Hall is a testament to this history and is still used today as a community and entertainment centre. The Welsh poet Daniel James (Gwyrosydd) composed the popular Welsh hymn Calon Lân while working as a coal miner at the Blaengarw pit. The town was a flashpoint of public disorder during the UK miners' strike (1984–1985).

Time banking

Blaengarw is home to the largest Time Bank in Europe the Blaengarw Time Centre, hosted by Creation Group.

The Blaengarw Time Centre is based in Blaengarw Workmen's Hall which was bought by the community in 2000. For every hour spent on community work citizens receive one "Time Credit" which can be used to attend one hour of a social, educational or cultural event. Community assets in the village include a food shop, a community café, a heritage café, a digital inclusion centre, a community library and a sculpture studio. Activities organised by the centre include coffee mornings, arts classes, information technology classes, a youth club, dance and drama workshops, sugar craft and after-school clubs.

Film
The 2001 comedy Very Annie Mary, starring Rachel Griffiths, Jonathan Pryce and Ioan Gruffudd was filmed in the village., as was the 2019 Channel 4 miniseries The Accident.

Notable people
See :Category:People from Blaengarw
[Brian D Plummer, author, dog breeder famous for the Plummer Terrier]
Kenneth "Ken" Davies
Daniel James (Gwyrosydd)
Ike Owens
Jeff Young (rugby player)
Dewi James (David James), co-founder of Vivid Entertainment

References

External links
 The Garw Valley Web Site
 Garw Valley Web Site
 www.geograph.co.uk : photos of Blaengarw and surrounding area

Villages in Bridgend County Borough